Hollymead is a census-designated place (CDP) in Albemarle County, Virginia, United States. The population as of the 2010 Census was 7,690.

Geography 
It is located about seven miles north of Charlottesville, near Charlottesville-Albemarle Airport.

References

Virginia Trend Report 2: State and Complete Places (Sub-state 2010 Census Data)

Unincorporated communities in Virginia
Census-designated places in Albemarle County, Virginia
Census-designated places in Virginia